White Reaper is an American garage punk band based in Louisville, Kentucky. The band comprises Tony Esposito (guitar/vocals), Ryan Hater, Hunter Thompson, Nick Wilkerson, and Sam Wilkerson. The band has released two EPs and four full-length albums, their first album in 2015 White Reaper Does It Again, and The World's Best American Band in 2017. White Reaper released their third studio album You Deserve Love on October 18, 2019, their major label debut. Their fourth studio album, Asking for a Ride, was released on January 27, 2023.

History

Early years (2012-2014) 
White Reaper was formed by Tony Esposito and Nick Wilkerson while they were in high school. When they were 17 years old, they saw an entirely white Grim Reaper prop in a Halloween Express, becoming known as White Reaper thereafter. The duo then recorded two demos, DEMO 2012 and WHITE AURA in 2012. A 7-inch featuring the songs "The Cut" and "Conspirator" was released in 2013 on Earthbound Records. Wilkerson's twin brother Sam Wilkerson then joined the band as the bassist. Elementary school friend of Esposito and keyboardist Ryan Hater would also join the band.

Polyvinyl Records (2014-2018) 

After signing to Polyvinyl Records in early 2014, their label debut EP White Reaper was released. The band followed it with a tour with Young Widows. In 2015, White Reaper's first studio album White Reaper Does It Again was released on Polyvinyl Records and they opened for bands such as Twin Peaks and Together Pangea. Guitarist Hunter Thompson joined the band in 2016. Their second album The World's Best American Band was released in 2017. In 2018, White Reaper played at South by Southwest and toured as an opening act for Weezer and Billy Idol.

Elektra years (2019-present) 
In 2019, White Reaper would sign with Elektra Records. Three singles were released from their upcoming albums in Summer of 2019. The song "Might Be Right" became the band's highest charting single, peaking at number six on the US Hot Rock Songs chart and atop the US Alternative Songs chart. White Reaper would play at the music festival Riot Fest and with The Killers. In October 2019, You Deserve Love was released, their major label debut. White Reaper appeared on Jimmy Kimmel Live! in December 2019, playing "Might Be Right" and "Real Long Time". White Reaper contributed a cover of the Metallica song "Sad But True" to the charity tribute album The Metallica Blacklist, released in September 2021.

White Reaper released their fourth studio album, Asking for a Ride, January 27, 2023 on Elektra Records.

Band members 
 Tony Esposito – guitar, vocals
 Ryan Hater – keyboard
 Hunter Thompson – guitar
 Nick Wilkerson – drums, percussion
 Sam Wilkerson – bass

Discography

Studio albums

EPs

Singles

Notes

References

External links

 White Reaper

Musical groups from Louisville, Kentucky
Indie rock musical groups from Kentucky
Musical groups established in 2014
2014 establishments in Kentucky